The 2013–14 DEL2 season was the first season of operation for the DEL2 (also known as DEL II). Replacing the 2nd Bundesliga, this league represents the second-level of ice hockey in Germany, below the Deutsche Eishockey Liga (DEL). The league operated with 12 teams during the 2013–14 season. The inaugural champions were the Fischtown Pinguins.

Regular season
In its inaugural season the league competed with 12 clubs which was extended to 14 in the following season.

Playoffs

Championship
The championship play-offs:

Relegation
In the relegation round the four bottom placed clubs played a best-of-seven knock-out series first in which EC Bad Nauheim defeated Eispiraten Crimmitschau and Heilbronner Falken the ESV Kaufbeuren. Following this the two losers entered another round with the best four Oberliga clubs, playing a home-and-away round. The two DEL2 clubs retained their league place while EC Kassel Huskies and Löwen Frankfurt won promotion. The other two Oberliga clubs, EHC Freiburg and VER Selb, remained at this level.

References

External links
 www.del-2.org, official website

2 season
Ger
2013-14